In aviation, a controlled flight into terrain (CFIT; usually  ) is an accident in which an airworthy aircraft, under pilot control, is unintentionally flown into the ground, a mountain, a body of water or an obstacle. In a typical CFIT scenario, the crew is unaware of the impending disaster until it is too late. The term was coined by engineers at Boeing in the late 1970s.

Accidents where the aircraft is out of control at the time of impact, because of mechanical failure or pilot error, are not considered CFIT (they are known as uncontrolled flight into terrain or UFIT), nor are incidents resulting from the deliberate action of the person at the controls, such as acts of terrorism or suicide by pilot.

According to Boeing in 1997, CFIT was a leading cause of airplane accidents involving the loss of life, causing over 9,000 deaths since the beginning of the commercial jet aircraft. CFIT was identified as a cause of 25% of USAF Class A mishaps between 1993 and 2002. According to data collected by the International Air Transport Association (IATA) between 2008 and 2017, CFITs accounted for six percent of all commercial aircraft accidents, and was categorized as "the second-highest fatal accident category after Loss of Control Inflight (LOCI)."

Causes

While there are many reasons why a plane might crash into terrain, including bad weather and navigation equipment problems, pilot error is the most common factor found in CFIT accidents.

The most common type of pilot error in CFIT accidents is spatial disorientation, a loss of situational awareness often resulting from reliance on the proprioception system for the perception of relative motion in conjunction with a loss of visual cues during dark or cloudy conditions. In these situations, pilots misunderstand their position, velocity, and/or heading during flight, which can lead to inappropriate control commands relative to the altitude of the surface of the Earth below and immediately ahead, on the course they are flying. Fatigue can cause even highly experienced professionals to make significant errors, which culminate in a CFIT accident. Furthermore, pilots of tactical air fighters may experience g-force induced loss of consciousness (G-LOC), leading to CFIT accidents.

CFIT accidents frequently involve a collision with terrain such as hills or mountains during conditions of reduced visibility, while conducting an approach to landing at the destination airport. Sometimes a contributing factor can be subtle navigation equipment malfunctions which, if not detected by the crew, may mislead them into improperly guiding the aircraft, despite other information received from properly functioning equipment.

Solutions
Before the installation of the first electronic warning systems, the only defenses against CFIT were pilot simulator training, traditional procedures, crew resource management (CRM) and radar surveillance by air traffic services. While those factors reduced the incidence of such accidents, they did not eliminate them. To further assist in preventing CFIT accidents, manufacturers developed terrain awareness and warning systems (TAWS). The first generation of those systems was known as a ground proximity warning system (GPWS), which used a radar altimeter to assist in calculating terrain closure rates. That system was further improved with the addition of a GPS terrain database and is now known as an enhanced ground proximity warning system (EGPWS). When combined with mandatory pilot simulator training which emphasizes proper responses to any caution or warning event, the system has proved very effective in preventing further CFIT accidents.

Smaller aircraft often use a GPS database of terrain to provide terrain warning. The GPS database contains a database of nearby terrain and will present terrain that is near the aircraft in red or yellow depending on its distance from the aircraft.

Statistics show that under circumstances where TAWS or EGPWS warnings are properly handled, aircraft fitted with a second-generation EGPWS will not suffer a CFIT accident. However, there are at least two CFIT accidents of planes with EGPWS/TAWS where crew ignored or overrode warnings: the Mirosławiec air disaster and the Mount Salak Sukhoi Superjet 100 crash. In the latter case the TAWS was working but the pilot intentionally turned it off.

The sterile flight deck rule was implemented to limit pilot distraction by banning any non-essential activities in the cockpit during critical phases of the flight, such as when operating at below .

See also

 Acronyms and abbreviations in avionics
 Aviation safety
 Minimum safe altitude warning (MSAW)

References

External links 
 CFIT articles in SKYbrary: The single point of reference in the network of aviation safety knowledge
 Aviation occurrence categories: Definitions and usage notes (CAST/ICAO)

Aviation risks
 
Articles containing video clips
Low flying